Just One of Those Things is a 1957 album by Nat King Cole, arranged by Billy May.  The record  placed at number 18 on the Billboard album chart.

Track listing
 "When Your Lover Has Gone" (Einar Aaron Swan) – 2:33
 "A Cottage for Sale" (Larry Conley, Willard Robison) – 3:00
 "Who's Sorry Now?" (Bert Kalmar, Harry Ruby, Ted Snyder) – 3:00
 "Once in a While" (Michael Edwards, Bud Green) – 2:50
 "These Foolish Things (Remind Me of You)" (Harry Link, Holt Marvell, Jack Strachey) – 3:49
 "Just for the Fun of It" (Lorenz Hart, A. Jackson) – 2:37
 "Don't Get Around Much Anymore" (Duke Ellington, Bob Russell) – 3:13
 "I Understand" (Kim Gannon, Mabel Wayne) – 2:27
 "Just One of Those Things" (Cole Porter) – 2:17
 "The Song is Ended (but the Melody Lingers On)" (Irving Berlin) – 2:49
 "I Should Care" (Sammy Cahn, Axel Stordahl, Paul Weston) – 2:49
 "The Party's Over" (Betty Comden, Adolph Green, Jule Styne) – 2:45

Just One of Those Things (And More) 
Capitol Records re-issued the album in 1987 as part of their CD Xtra Trax Pax series as Just One of Those Things (And More). Featuring a cropped image of the original sleeve artwork, the release included the above track-listing alongside three additional tracks:

 "Day In—Day Out" (R. Bloom/J. Mercer)
 "I'm Gonna Sit Right Down (And Write Myself a Letter)" (F. E. Ahlert/J. Young)
 "Something Makes Me Want to Dance" (C. Romoff/D. Meehan)

Personnel

Performance
 Nat King Cole – vocal
 Billy May – arranger, conductor

References

1957 albums
Albums arranged by Billy May
Albums conducted by Billy May
Albums recorded at Capitol Studios
Capitol Records albums
Nat King Cole albums